Twyla Roman (born July 20, 1941) was a Republican member of the Ohio House of Representatives. She represented district in Summit County, Ohio from 1995-2002.  She was succeeded by eventual Ohio Auditor Mary Taylor.

References

External links

Profile on the Ohio Ladies' Gallery website

Living people
Republican Party members of the Ohio House of Representatives
Women state legislators in Ohio
1941 births
21st-century American politicians
21st-century American women politicians